Chokery Kharlan is a village in Nankana Sahib district in Pakistan.

Populated places in Nankana Sahib District